Sahalahti is a former municipality of Finland. It was located in the province of Western Finland and was part of the Pirkanmaa region. The municipality had a population of 2,229 (2003) and covered an area of 171.96 km² of which 35.09 km² was water. The population density was 16.3 inhabitants per km². Sahalahti joined to Kangasala on January 1, 2005. Its original administrative center was the village by the same name.

The municipality was unilingually Finnish.

Kangasala
Populated places disestablished in 2005
Former municipalities of Finland